The Poland men's national handball team is controlled by the Polish Handball Association (Związek Piłki Ręcznej w Polsce), and represents Poland in international matches.

Honours

Competitive record

Olympic Games

World Championship

European Championship

Competitive record at the European Championship

Competitive record in qualifying rounds

Team

Current squad
Squad for the 2023 World Men's Handball Championship.

Head coach: Patryk Rombel

Head coaches

Statistics
Matches include data obtained exclusively in official international matches of the Polish national team. All unofficial matches of the national team, or meetings in the frame other than the national team – played by a player – are not included in the following lists.

Kit suppliers
The Polish national kit is supplied by Joma.

Media Coverage
Poland's matches are currently televised by TVP Sport and Eurosport.

References

External links

IHF profile

Handball in Poland
Men's national handball teams
National sports teams of Poland